Pull-Ups is a brand of disposable training pants made under the Huggies brand of baby products. The product was first introduced in 1989 and became popular with the phrase "I'm a big kid now!" which is the product's slogan. The training pants are marketed with purple packaging: boys' designs are blue and currently feature characters from the Disney Junior show Mickey Mouse Funhouse; girls' designs are purple with the Disney Junior show Minnie's Bow-Toons characters.

Huggies Pull-Ups variations
Huggies Pull-Ups have been distributed in 4 different types which have been intact since 2011. (not counting the renaming of Wetness Liner.)

Learning Designs
In March 2005, the original Huggies Pull-Ups were renamed Learning Designs after the small pictures that fade when they become wet.

Wetness Liner
Wetness Liner Pull-Ups Training Pants were first distributed in 2005 as a competitor to the now defunct Pampers Feel 'N Learn. These Pull-Ups were much like Learning Designs Pull-Ups, except they added special liner to the Wetness Liner ones. This liner is placed on the inside of the Pull-up, where the wearer is most likely to wet, and is sensitive to urine. When the Wetness Liner is exposed to urine, it causes the wearer to feel uncomfortable, and learn that s/he shouldn't wet him/herself and should use the toilet instead. Wetness Liner Pull-Ups also have the Learning Designs, which also fade when the wearer wets the pull-up.

Cool-Alert name change
In 2006, the Wetness Liner Pull-Ups were replaced by Cool-Alert. This variation has since been intact since.

GoodNites
GoodNites are used to control bedwetting. In 2008, The Goodnites disposable underwear split up from the Pull Ups brand merging with the Huggies brand, Then in 2011, Goodnites split up from the Huggies brand and formed their own brand which is the same name as the product.

Night-Time
At the same time that Wetness Liner was renamed Cool Alert, Pull-Ups introduced Night Time Pull-Ups. The Night Time Pull-Ups were very much like a regular Pull-Ups pant, except it has more absorbency, and they have bedtime designs featuring Disney's Princesses Belle and Cinderella characters for girls and Toy Story characters for boys. The Night Time Pull-Ups are not available in the 12M-24M or 4T-5T sizes.

Potty training
The main use for Pull-Ups Training Pants is as an aid for toilet training toddlers and to help them learn not to wet. Although up until 2000 Pull-Ups Training Pants were nothing more than diapers that go off and on like underwear, since 2000, there have been several changes to them. The first one was the addition of magic stars/flowers (now known as Learning Designs on March 2, 2005) on the inside only in 2005-2007 and front of the pant that fade when the wearer wets it as a way of discouraging wetting, and as a motivation to stay dry in time to make it to the potty, and if the wearer stays dry, the stars/flowers will stay on the Pull-Up. Next was the addition of Easy-Open sides. These made it so that the sides of the Pull-Up still go off and on like underwear, but enable parents to easily open the Pull-Up to check to see if the wearer soiled the Pull-Up, or to quickly change a messy Pull-Up. Though many enjoy this feature, some parents have criticized this feature for causing the Pull-Up to rip too easily.

History
1989
 Huggies introduced Pull-Ups brand disposable training pants.
1991
 The first Pull-Ups commercial aired on television and its most famous slogan, "I'm a big kid now!" became its main slogan.
1992
 Single-sex Pull-Ups training pants were introduced with customized absorbency placed where boys and girls wet the most and also gender-specific prints: trucks for boys and pastel colored animals for girls.
1994
 GoodNites disposable underwear for older children were introduced.
 Leak guards were added to handle wetness better than any other training pant.
1995
 A back label was added to the pants to distinguish the obverse from the reverse.
1996
 Realistic underwear designs were introduced, with a fly front style for boys and lace style for girls.
1997
 Disney character designs were introduced, starring Mickey Mouse for boys and Minnie Mouse for girls.
1999
 GoodNites introduces XL size fitting kids well over 100lbs which are offered like all GoodNites of this era in all white only.
2000
 Pull-Ups added a wetness indicator on the front of the pants to tell whether or not the wearer is wet.
2003
 Toy Story and Disney Princesses designs debut for boys and girls respectively.
 The slogan that was used in the original late-1980s and early-1990s commercials, "I'm a big kid now!", was recycled for the product's recent commercials.
2004
 Single-sex underwear was introduced with customized absorbency placed were boys and girls wet the most and also gender-specific prints.
2005
 Training pants with a Wetness Liner were introduced which are similar to the Learning Designs training pants, but contain a liner that makes the wearer feel when (s)he is wet by having the liner have an unpleasant feel to it when it is wet.
2006
 Night*Time training pants are introduced, Wetness Liner training pants are renamed to Cool-Alert, and Cars designs debut for boys to correspond with the film's release.
2008
 GoodNites halts its connection with Pull-Ups and is now linked to Huggies and Kimberly-Clark. 
2009
 The infamous Potty Dance debuted on airwaves. This was deemed appalling due to suggestive movement of pelvic areas, and was since pulled and replaced with a non-offensive version.
 Flying stars were added to the bright orange background.
2010
 Pull-Ups offered a phone call service associated with Disney. Mainly, as a reward for finishing potty training, the parent of the wearer could request a phone call in which the caller pretends to be a Disney Princess or Toy Story character. This limited time offer is currently defunct.
 Cars designs are replaced with Toy Story 3 designs which corresponded with the latter film's release.
2011
 Toy Story 3 designs are replaced with Cars 2 designs which corresponded with the latter film's release.
 GoodNites halts its connection with Huggies but is still connected with Kimberly-Clark.
2012
 Minnie Mouse returned on some girls' Pull-Ups.
 The sides on boys' Pull-Ups were recolored from blue to red.
2013
 The sides of boys' Pull-Ups were recolored from red to blue.
 The sides of girls' Pull-Ups were recolored from pink to purple.
 Monsters University designs were added for both genders to correspond with the film's release.
 Cinderella was replaced by Ariel on girls' Learning Designs and by Rapunzel on girls' Night*Time Pull-Ups.
 Toy Story designs return for boys.
March 31, 2013
 Pull-Ups Cool Alert was discontinued in the United States.
2014
 Monsters University, Minnie Mouse, and Toy Story designs are replaced with Doc McStuffins designs for girls and Jake and the Never Land Pirates designs for boys.
 Pull-Ups Cool Alert returns exclusively online at Amazon, Diapers.com, Drugstore.com, Walmart, Sam’s Club, Target and Peapod.com.
 Pull-Ups made their training pants more absorbent.
2015
 Sofia the First designs debut for girls.
 Mickey Mouse returned on some boys' Pull-Ups.
 Minnie Mouse returned on some girls' Pull-Ups.
 Mater returned on some boys' Night*Time Pull-Ups.
 Cinderella returned on some girls' Night*Time Pull-Ups.
 Cool Alert is available for retailers everywhere under its new name Cool & Learn.
 Pull-Ups' iconic "Big Kid" child photo is removed from packaging.
 Pull-Ups resembles its 2009 logo sans a yellow outline.
2016
 Whisker Haven Tales with the Palace Pets designs debut for girls and Kion from The Lion Guard designs debut for boys.
 Night*Time Pull-Ups introduced Miles Callisto from Miles from Tomorrowland designs for boys.
 Belle returns on some girls' Night*Time Pull-Ups.
2017
 The Lion Guard designs are replaced with Lightning McQueen and Jackson Storm designs in a single case.
 Whisker Palace Pets designs are replaced with Doc McStuffins and Minnie Mouse designs in a single case.
 Cars 3 designs are added for both genders to correspond with the film's release.
 Toy Story designs replaced the Miles from Tomorrowland prints on the Night*Time variant.
2018
 The Lion Guard designs are replaced with Mickey Mouse designs.
2019
 12M-24M sizes are introduced.
 Toy Story 4 designs are added for both genders to correspond with the film's release.
2020
 New packaging is introduced with the following changes:
 The iconic "Big Kid" child photo returns; however, instead of using a potty or laying in a bed, the child is simply smiling while wearing the training pants.
 The base color for both genders is purple, with accents of blue or pink for boys and girls, respectively.
 Pull-Ups refreshed its logo, with a flat design and small tweaking on the lettering.
 Toy Story 4 designs were replaced by Mickey Mouse designs on boys' Learning Designs and by Cars designs on boys' Cool & Learn Pull-Ups.
 Toy Story 4 designs were replaced by Minnie Mouse designs on girls' Learning Designs and by Belle from Beauty and the Beast designs on girls' Cool & Learn Pull-Ups.
 A plant-based line titled "New Leaf" was introduced with Frozen II designs for both genders.

Controversy
The Cool-Alert Pull-Ups had a controversial issue regarding that the wearer likely will either get a rash or not feel the cooling effect when (s)he wets the pant. The 2009 Potty Dance commercial had aggravated parents due to its suggestive dancing, mainly, when the toddlers put their hands on their genitalia and make circular motions with their hips. This has been pulled from airwaves and replaced with a more appropriate version by Ralph's World, which replaces the offensive movements with sidesteps.

Competition
Ever since Huggies Pull-Ups became popular, several other brands tried to copy their product. The first competitor besides store brand training pants were Pampers Trainers made from 1993 until 1995. In 2002, Pampers introduced "Easy Ups" training pants. The Pampers brand also had training pants with a wetness liner called "Feel 'N Learn" which were made from 2004 until 2007. Luvs also had a line of training pants made in the 1990s.

Sponsorships
Pull-Ups are the official sponsor of ESPN Radio's coverage of Major League Baseball, as well as Westwood One's coverage of Sunday Night Football, and on many terrestrial broadcast television stations and children's TV brands, including Nickelodeon, Disney, Cartoon Network, Universal Kids (formerly known as (PBS Kids) Sprout), etc.

See also
 Huggies
 Toilet training

External links
 Pull-Ups Training Pants Official Website

Products introduced in 1989
Kimberly-Clark brands
Diaper brands
Toilet training